Bruce Hunter (born 1952) is a Canadian poet, fiction and non-fiction author.

Biography
Bruce Hunter was born in Calgary, Alberta. He is the author of seven books, five of them poetry, as well as a collection of linked short stories and a novel. In 2010, his seventh book, Two O'Clock Creek - Poems New and Selected won the Acorn-Plantos Peoples' Poetry Award.

In 2009, Bruce's novel, In the Bear's House, won the Canadian Rockies prize selected from over 100 books from 10 countries at the Banff Mountain Book Festival.

His poetry collection Coming Home From Home (2000), was short-listed for the 1997 CBC/Saturday Night literary competition and selected as one of the top ten People's Choice poetry books of 2000. His linked story collection, Country Music Country, was published in 1996 to critical acclaim and broadcast on CBC Radio's Between the Covers. Wayson Choy said in Saturday Night: "Bruce Hunter writes with bold restraint and a poet's sensibility. His blue collar characters walk the tight line of their lives into the common universe that includes us all."

In 2017, Bruce was Author in Residence at Calgary Public Library and in 2007, he was Writer in Residence at the Richmond Hill Public Library, in the Greater Toronto Region; in 2002, he was Writer in Residence at the Banff Centre for the Writers' Guild of Alberta.

Bruce was deaf as an infant and was affected by low vision most of his adult life. He worked for 15 years as a gardener, labourer, equipment operator, and Zamboni driver before returning to school in his late twenties.  While working those jobs, his poetry won him a scholarship to study creative writing at the Banff School of Fine Arts with W.O. Mitchell. Bruce went on to study film and literature at York University, graduating with a Bachelor of Fine Arts (Honours).

From 1986 to 2012, Bruce taught English and Liberal Studies at Seneca College. In the 1980s, for four years he was poetry and poetry reviews editor and columnist for Toronto-based Cross Canada Writers' Quarterly. He has also taught creative writing at the Banff Centre and York University.

Now retired from teaching, Bruce writes full-time in addition to hosting readings and workshops on creativity and disability. He is a long-time member of the Canadian Hearing Society, the Canadian Hard of Hearing Association, the Canadian National Institute for the Blind, the League of Canadian Poets, the Writers' Guild of Alberta, the Writers' Union of Canada, and the Sierra Club of Canada.

Publications

Books
Country Music Country - The Reboot, short story collection, 2019 (with an introduction by Shaun Hunter and a Postscript to the new and third edition by the author), ( print,  ePub) 
Two O'Clock Creek, poems new and selected, 2010
In The Bear's House, novel, 2009
Coming Home From Home, poetry, 2000
Country Music Country, short story collection, 1996
The Beekeeper's Daughter, poetry, 1986
Benchmark, poetry, 1982
Selected Canadian Rifles, poetry, 1981

Anthologies
  'Sweet Water - Poems to the Watersheds' - 2020
   'Portraits of Canadian Writers' - 2017
Enchantments of Place - 2017
Deaf Poets Society - 2016
World Poetry, English/Mandarin - 2014
El Ghibli, Italian/English - 2014
A Heart of Wisdom – Life Writing as Empathetic Inquiry - 2012
Coastal Moments Writing Journal - 2011
Stories About Us - 2005
Writing the Terrain - 2005
Honouring Mothers - 2004
Smaller than God: Poems of the Spiritual - 2001
2000% Cracked Wheat - 2000
Following the Plough: Recovering the Rural - 2000
Line By Line - 1999
A Rich Garland: Poems for A.M. Klein - 1999 
The Summit Anthology - 1999
90 Poets of the Nineties: An Anthology of American and Canadian Poetry - 1998
In the Clear - 1998
Reading Writing - 1996
What Is Already Known - 1995
Paperwork: New Work Poetry - 1990
Your Voice and Mine - 1987
No Feather, No Ink: Louis Riel Poems - 1985
Dancing Visions: New Poets in Review - 1985
Glass Canyons - 1984
New Voices: A Celebration of Canadian Poetry - 1984
Going For Coffee: Work Poetry - 1981

See also

List of Canadian poets

References

20th-century Canadian poets
Canadian male poets
21st-century Canadian poets
20th-century Canadian novelists
21st-century Canadian novelists
Canadian male short story writers
Living people
1952 births
Deaf poets
Canadian educators
Canadian male novelists
20th-century Canadian short story writers
21st-century Canadian short story writers
Writers from Calgary
Canadian deaf people
20th-century Canadian male writers
21st-century Canadian male writers
Academic staff of Seneca College